Fort Mangochi is a historical ruin located in the mountains nearby the small town of Namwera in Mangochi District, Malawi (formerly the British protectorate of Nyasaland). The ruins contain spacious walled-off rock walls, several feet thick and 2-3 meters tall, as well as a number of old buildings the last of which were constructed with fired brick and built around 1895. 

The high plateau surrounded by mountains was originally home to a famous Yao chief (presently known as Jalasi but formerly referred to as Zarafi). Along with other Yao chiefs Mponda and Makanjila, Jalasi resisted the British forces as he and other chiefs were involved in the lucrative slave trade. Jalasi fought off the British in 1891 but a stronger attack overwhelmed his people in 1895. Major Edwards was allegedly the first white man to step into the village, completely void of villagers on October 28th, 1895 after the attack carried out by enlisted soldiers of Indian Sikh, Makua, Atonga and Yao men. An estimated 25,000 Yao called this place home, named after the Yao word for the type of tree that was common in the area and used as a local variety of rope for tying (magoji). Lieutenant E. G. Alston was commissioned with building a permanent fortress on the site.

The mountain varies between 4,500 and 4,200 feet above sea level and is located just below and to the north of the main peak of Mangochi mountain at 5,713 feet.

A number of buildings feature sign posts indicating what purpose each structure served including servants quarters, a flag post, Indian hospital, parade grounds, etc.

It is said that Chief Jalasi fled to Portuguese-ruled Mozambique and died there in 1906 but many of his subject returned to the area. The fort was used as a prison from 1907-1910 and as a training camp during World War I by the King's African Rifles.

References 
 Cole-King, P.A., “Mangochi: the Mountain, the People and the Fort”, Society of Malawi

External links 

 Tim Cowley's article available from Ajambule.com originally published in Ulendo Magazine, Issue 19 (2011)

History of Malawi
Yao (East Africa)